Ondřej Karlovský (born 10 July 1991 in Hradec Králové) is a Czech slalom canoeist who has competed at the international level since 2006.

He won two medals in the C2 team event at the ICF Canoe Slalom World Championships with a gold in 2013 and a bronze in 2014. He also won three silver and four bronze medals at the European Canoe Slalom Championships.

His partner in the C2 boat is Jakub Jáně.

World Cup individual podiums

References

External links

1991 births
Czech male canoeists
Living people
Medalists at the ICF Canoe Slalom World Championships
Sportspeople from Hradec Králové